Trupanea bonariensis is a species of tephritid or fruit flies in the genus Trupanea of the family Tephritidae.

Distribution
Bolivia, Paraguay, Argentina, South Brazil.

References

Tephritinae
Insects described in 1908
Diptera of South America